William J. Sheils , known as Bill Sheils, is professor emeritus in history at the University of York and a fellow of the Royal Historical Society. Sheils is a specialist in the early modern religious and social history of Britain.

Education
Sheils was educated at the William Ellis School, North London (1957–64), and earned his BA at York (1964–67), and his PhD at King's College, London.

Career
Sheils first worked on the Victoria County History before joining the University of York as an archivist at the Borthwick Institute in 1973 where he worked on the post-medieval collections until 1988. He then taught nineteenth- and twentieth-century social and economic history, and subsequently early modern religious and social history with a specialism in Britain. Sheils retired from teaching in 2011 to become a full-time researcher.

Sheils has written extensively for the Journal of Ecclesiastical History, as well as contributing to the Economic History Review, The Sixteenth Century Journal, and Northern History.

In 2012, Sheils was the recipient of a festschrift, Getting Along? Religious Identities and Confessional Relations in Early Modern England - Essays in Honour of Professor W. J. Sheils (St. Andrews Studies in Reformation History, Ashgate, 2012), edited by Adam Morton and Nadine Lewycky.

Memberships
Sheils is a fellow of the Royal Historical Society and a former president of the Ecclesiastical History Society.

Personal life
Sheils is a parishioner of St Aelred's in the Roman Catholic Diocese of Middlesbrough.

Selected publications
The Puritans in the Diocese of Peterborough, 1558–1610. Northamptonshire Record Society, 1979. 
The English Reformation 1530–1570. Longman, 1989. (Seminar Studies in History)

References 

Academics of the University of York
Living people
British historians of religion
Alumni of the University of York
Fellows of the Royal Historical Society
Historians of Christianity
British Roman Catholics
Alumni of King's College London
Contributors to the Victoria County History
Presidents of the Ecclesiastical History Society
Year of birth missing (living people)
Roman Catholic scholars